Commediasexi is a 2006 Italian comedy film.

Plot
Starring Paolo Bonolis, Sergio Rubini and Stefania Rocca, the film mocks the Italian political class and its hypocrisy. The zealot politician Massimo (Paolo Bonolis), proponent of a law about the defense of family, has a secret love affair with Martina, a young emerging actress (Elena Santarelli). To divert any suspicions, he brings his family on holiday to Paris and tasks his driver, Mariano (Sergio Rubini), with looking after his beloved. After photos portraying Mariano and Martina as lovers are published in local gossip magazines, Mariano's wife faints, is hospitalized and leaves him. Massimo comes back to Rome thinking to be out of danger, but Massimo and Martina take revenge on him. The happy ending comes on Christmas's eve when the truth surfaces.

Cast
Sergio Rubini: Mariano
Paolo Bonolis: Massimo Bonfili
Margherita Buy: Dora
Rocco Papaleo: Tony
Michele Placido: Salvatore
Stefania Rocca: Pia
Elena Santarelli: Martina
Marco Cocci: Mino
Paola Tiziana Cruciani: Sister Giulia
Fabio De Luigi: Nardi
Massimo Wertmuller: Onorevole Nappi
Maurizio Micheli: The Stage Actor

External links

2006 films
2006 comedy films
Italian comedy films
2000s Italian-language films
Films set in Rome
Films directed by Alessandro D'Alatri
2000s Italian films